The Piel CP.60 Diamant is a single-engine light aircraft designed in France in the 1960s and marketed for home building.

Design and development
The Diamant is a conventional, low-wing cantilever monoplane and essentially an enlarged version of Piel's successful Emeraude designed to accommodate more passengers. This extra capacity is provided by a redesigned fuselage which is higher in the rear section and longer overall. While the Emeraude has only two seats, side-by-side, the Diamant has an extra bench seat at the rear of the cabin to seat one or two more people. The wingspan is also greater than that of the Emeraude, allowing for a greater maximum take-off weight. The 110 page set of plans included modifications for retractable gear, tricycle gear, and wing mounted fuel tanks.

As with the Emeraude, Piel obtained type certification for the Diamant, allowing it to be manufactured on a commercial basis. However, unlike the Emeraude, this did not actually transpire, and the Diamant was only ever built as a homebuilt.

By the late 1970s, the original versions of the Diamant were no longer offered and had been supplanted by the Super Diamant, designed for more powerful engines and featuring revised tail surfaces.

Variants
 CP.60 Diamant - prototype with  Continental engine.
 CP.601 Diamant - version with  Continental engine.
 CP.602 Diamant - version with  Potez engine.
 CP.603 Diamant - version with 115 hp Lycoming engine
 CP.604 Super Diamant - version with  Continental engine.
 CP.605 Super Diamant - 4 seat version with  Lycoming O-320-E2A engine.
 CP.605B Super Diamant - CP.605 with retractable tricycle landing gear.
 CP.606 Super Diamant - version with 140 hp Lycoming engine
 CP.607 Super Diamant - version with 130 hp Continental engine
 CP.608 Super Diamant - version with 180 hp Lycoming engine
 CP.615 Super Diamant - version with 160 hp engine

Specifications (CP.605B)

Notes

References

 
 
 
 
 

1960s French civil utility aircraft
Piel aircraft
Homebuilt aircraft
Single-engined tractor aircraft
Low-wing aircraft